Stony Plain Records is a Canadian independent record label, which specializes in roots music genres such as country, folk, and blues. The label has released more than 300 albums.

History
Stony Plain was founded by Holger Petersen and Alvin Jahns in 1976.  The label released their first album that year.  Beginning in 1989, the label's releases were distributed by Warner Music Canada   Petersen acted as the company's president for many years.

Stony Plain has previously licensed recordings from American labels Rounder Records, Sugar Hill Records, HighTone Records and Blind Pig Records for Canadian release. The label has also been the Canadian distributor for albums by American artists such as Steve Earle, Gillian Welch, and Emmylou Harris.

The label is still owned and operated by its founders Alvin Jahns and Holger Petersen. Petersen is also the author of two books of artist interviews and also hosts the weekly series Saturday Night Blues on CBC Radio One, Radio Two and SiriusXM 169 and Natch'l Blues on the CKUA Radio Network.  In 2018 the company was sold to Linus Entertainment, and moved from Stony Plain Alberta to Waterdown Ontario.
.

In 2016 Story Plain celebrated its 40th anniversary by releasing a three-disc compilation album of highlights from its collection.

Canadian roster 
 Long John Baldry
 Kevin Breit
 Jim Byrnes
 Downchild Blues Band
 Gary Fjellgaard
 Amos Garrett
 Jeff Healey
 Tim Hus
 Sass Jordan
 Colin Linden
 Corb Lund
 Harry Manx
 Big Dave McLean
 MonkeyJunk
 Paul Reddick
 Spirit of the West
 Steve Strongman
 Ian Tyson
 Valdy
 Kenny "Blues Boss" Wayne
 Jr. Gone Wild
 David Wilcox

International roster 
 Billy Boy Arnold
 Asleep at the Wheel
 Eric Bibb
 Rory Block
 James Burton
 Rodney Crowell
 Ronnie Earl
 Steve Earle
 Amos Garrett
 Emmylou Harris
 Big Walter Horton
 Albert Lee
 Jay McShann
 Maria Muldaur
 New Guitar Summit (Jay Geils, Gerry Beaudoin, Duke Robillard)
 Doug Sahm
 Gene Taylor
 Joe Louis Walker
 Jimmy Witherspoon

Awards
Recognition for the label and its artists includes 11 Juno Awards, six Grammy Award nominations, several Blues Music Awards, nine Canadian Country Music Awards for Label of the Year, more than 30 Maple Blues Awards and a number of Western Canada Music Awards. Stony Plain Records has earned several Gold and Platinum records for releases by artists as Ian Tyson, Corb Lund and various Best Of compilations.

The label was the recipient of The Blues Foundation's Keeping the Blues Alive Award in 2014.

See also 

20 Years of Stony Plain, compilation album released by Stony Plain in 1996

References

External links 
Official website
Stony Plain Records Newsletter Archives

Record labels established in 1976
Canadian independent record labels
Canadian country music record labels
Blues record labels
Folk record labels
Companies based in Hamilton, Ontario
1976 establishments in Alberta